Kozhikode metropolitan area or Calicut urban agglomeration or Kozhikode urban agglomeration is the 19th largest urban agglomeration in India and 2nd largest in Kerala after the Kochi Metropolitan Area according to the 2011 Census of India. The Urban Agglomeration spans across 909.79 square kilometres of area encompassing a population of 2,028,399 (2.028 million). 

The area constituted on the basis of census data 2011, consists of Corporation of Kozhikode and the municipalities of Vatakara, Koyilandy, Ramanattukara, Feroke, Payyoli, Koduvally, Mukkam .

Constituents of the urban agglomeration

References

Geography of Kozhikode district
Metropolitan areas of India